People is the 49th studio album by American musician James Brown. The album was released in March 1980 and was his last original recording for Polydor Records, after having spent nine years on the label. The front cover photograph was credited to David Alexander.

Track listing

References

1980 albums
James Brown albums
Albums produced by Brad Shapiro
Polydor Records albums